Isaac Broid Zajman (b. Mexico City, November 20, 1952) is a Mexican architect and designer.

Biography 
Broid studied under J. Francisco Serrano Cacho and Carlos Mijares Bracho at the faculty of architecture and urban planning of the Universidad Iberoamericana, and graduated as master of design at the Oxford Polytechnic, England. Afterwards he visited landscaping courses at the  Universidad Nacional Autónoma de México (UNAM), and graduated in urban planning and landscaping at University of Edinburgh. His works include residential, commercial and cultural buildings, as well as urban planning and design works.

He is professor history of architecture at the Universidad Iberoamericana, and is editorial member of several magazines of architecture. Since 1999 he has been member of the Sistema Nacional de Creadores de Arte (SNCA). Broid' designs were multiple awarded, amongst others with the Record Interior Award of the Architectural Record magazine, with a silver medal at the 1991 biennale in Bulgaria, and with an honorary mention at the Mexican biennale of architecture.

Selected works 
 Metro line A stations together with Aurelio Nuño Morales and Carlos Mac Gregor Ancinola
 Centro de la Imagen, Plaza de la Ciudadela, México D. F., together with Abraham Zabludovsky, 1993
 Telcel office building, México D. F.
 "Guillermo Bonfil Batalla" library, Cuicuilco
 "Sondi Ambrosi" house, Puerto Escondido
 "Vázquez" house, Coyoacán
 Videoteca Nacional Educativa, together with Miquel Adrià and Michel Rojkind
 "Mata" bar, Centro Histórico of Mexico City
Teopanzolco Cultural Center, Cuernavaca, Morelos, 2017

References

External links 
 Bilder der Werke von Isaac Broid bei ''parella.com
 
 Website von Isaac Broid
 Photo

Mexican architects
People from Mexico City
Mexican designers
Academic staff of Universidad Iberoamericana
1952 births
Living people